Ashcroftine-(Y) is an alkali yttrium calcium carbonate mineral with the chemical formula KNa(Y,Ca)SiO(OH)(CO)·8HO. It was first identified in southern Greenland and named after British mineral collector Frederick Noel Ashcroft.

References

External links 

 Ashcroftine-(Y) data sheet
 Ashcroftine-(Y) on the Handbook of Mineralogy

Potassium minerals
Sodium minerals
Yttrium minerals
Calcium minerals
Silicon compounds
Oxygen compounds
Hydroxide minerals
Carbonate minerals